Kim Ki-su (born August 5, 1982) is a North Korean former football player.

Club statistics

References

External links

1982 births
Living people
Association football people from Tokyo
North Korean footballers
J2 League players
Japan Football League players
Mito HollyHock players
Fukushima United FC players
Association football midfielders